Sirius XM Indie, formerly known as Maxim Radio and Stars Too, was a talk channel heard on the Sirius and XM satellite radio platforms. The channel is a spin-off of its sister station Sirius XM Stars.

History

Maxim Radio (2005–2008)
On February 5, 2005, Maxim Radio was launched on Sirius Satellite Radio, and had several popular shows.  The morning show was hosted by Steve Covino and  Rich Davis.  Sami J began as the producer/director. Later Sami J was replaced by Spot. Covino & Rich aired from 3-7pm EST and replayed from 6-10am the following weekday, after former afternoon host Mike Bower moved to mornings.  He was joined by Scooter and the provocative Producer Laura. The Nighttime Nation was hosted by Evan Roberts and Brian O'Leary with producer Rory Hamptons. The night time slot was later taken over by John Devore and Diana Falzone. with producer Princess Lea. On July 26, 2007, Stretch, host of the hourly "man-ER-tainment Report" moved to the late-morning shift, with his show starting at 10:00 AM Eastern.

Sirius XM Stars Too (2008–2013)
On November 12, 2008, when Sirius and XM merged their channel lineups, Sirius Stars personality Jay Thomas announced his show was moving to a yet-to-be-determined channel, which was later revealed to be Maxim Radio. Afterwards, morning man Stretch announced on his MySpace that Sirius and Maxim were terminating their partnership, and that he did not make the cut for the new channel lineup. Stretch was later rehired and became the producer of Faction's The Jason Ellis Show. John Devore and Diana Falzone were split up onto other channels, with Diane moving to Cosmo Radio and John moving to a political talk channel. His show begins in the near future.

Sirius XM Stars Too debuted on Sirius 108 and XM 139 on November 17, 2008, at midnight eastern time. The channel indeed brought Jay Thomas' show to afternoons, with Vinnie Politan in the morning, and Covino and Rich from Maxim Radio in mid-days. The evening and overnight schedules replayed the 9 hours of live programming. In 2009, Sirius XM expanded Stars Too's weekend programming lineup with more original and syndicated programming. Fridays introduced Game On with Jordan Harbinger in the evenings. Game On replays were added to weekends, along with a Best of Mad Dog Radio special with highlights from sister channel Mad Dog Radio. Syndicated offerings included Motor Trend Radio from Talk Radio Network, Into Tomorrow with Dave Graveline from Lifestyle Talk Radio Network, and Tom Gresham's Gun Talk from Talk Shows USA. Stars Too also brought over the XM series, America's Car Show with Tom Torbjornsen. Following the Sirius XM channel change in May 2011, Stars Too moved to channel 104 on both services.

Indie (2013–)
Indie channel, launched on February 13, 2013, features daily shows hosted by Pete Dominick, Covino & Rich and Jay Thomas, plus shows from Rotten Tomatoes, BuzzFeed, Neil Strauss and others.

References

External links
Sirius XM Indie

XM Satellite Radio channels
Digital-only radio stations
News and talk radio stations in the United States
Sirius Satellite Radio channels
Radio stations established in 2005
Defunct radio stations in the United States